Bela Reka (Serbian for "White River") may refer to several places in Serbia:

 , a village in Barajevo Municipality
 Bela Reka (Šabac), a village in Šabac Municipality
 Gornja Bela Reka (Zaječar), village in Zaječar Municipality
 Donja Bela Reka (Bor), a village in Bor Municipality
 Gornja Bela Reka (Nova Varoš), a village in Nova Varoš Municipality
 Donja Bela Reka (Nova Varoš), a village in Nova Varoš Municipality

See also 
 Bela River (disambiguation)
 Byala Reka (disambiguation)
 Belareca, a river in Caraș-Severin County, Romania
 Bijela Rijeka (disambiguation), similar name